= Mount Prometheus =

Mountain in Nevada, United States

Coordinates: 39.4952035°N 117.0442556°W

Mount Prometheus is a summit in the U.S. state of Nevada. The elevation is 7,985 feet (2,434 m).

Mount Prometheus was named after Prometheus, from Greek mythology. A variant name is "Prometheus Peak".
